Qeshlaq-e Agh Laqan (also Romanized as Qeshlāq-e Āgh Lāqān; also known as Āghlāqān) is a village in Abish Ahmad Rural District, Abish Ahmad District, Kaleybar County, East Azerbaijan Province, Iran. At the 2006 census, its population was 32, in 7 families.

References 

Populated places in Kaleybar County